The Music of Sumatra, Sumatra is a part of Indonesia; its best-known musical output is probably dangdut, a rabab/saluang instrumental style.

The Sumatran Toba people are distinctive in their use of tuned drums to carry the melody in their music; this practice is very rare worldwide. The Toba also use an instrument similar to the oboe and several kinds of gongs. Ensembles include the gondang sabangunan. The Mandailing people is one of the ethnic group from the Province of North Sumatra. Their cultural heritage is the Gordang sambilan (nine drums graded in size from large to small), complemented by two big gongs (agung), a bamboo flute called sarune or saleot, and a pair of small cymbals called tali sasayat.

Films
2007 – Sumatran Folk Cinema (dir. Mark Gergis and Alan Bishop; Sublime Frequencies)

See also

 Music of Indonesia
 Music of Sunda
 Music of Java
 Music of Bali

External links

 
Sumatra
Sumatra